Onelki García (born August 2, 1989) is a Cuban professional baseball pitcher for the Leones de Yucatán of the Mexican League. He has played in Major League Baseball (MLB) for the Los Angeles Dodgers and Kansas City Royals, and in Nippon Professional Baseball (NPB) for the Chunichi Dragons and Hanshin Tigers.

Career

Cuban career and defection
García began playing in the Cuban National Series at age 18. In three seasons for the Guantánamo team he had a 12–12 win–loss record with a 4.73 earned run average (ERA).

García defected from Cuba in August 2010 with hopes of pursuing a professional baseball career in the United States. He was originally declared eligible for the 2011 Major League Baseball Draft but was ruled ineligible due to issues with his residency.  A year later he was drafted by the Los Angeles Dodgers in the third round of the 2012 Major League Baseball Draft.

Los Angeles Dodgers
García started his professional career with the High-A Rancho Cucamonga Quakes. He started one game, striking out four over two innings pitched. He started the 2013 season with the Double-A Chattanooga Lookouts. He was promoted to the Triple-A Albuquerque Isotopes in August 2013. Between the two levels, he was in 35 games (6 as a starter) and was 2–4 with a 2.90 ERA.

On September 11, 2013, the Dodgers purchased his contract and called him up to the Major Leagues. He made his debut that night and walked the one batter he faced against the Arizona Diamondbacks. He pitched 1 innings over three games for the Dodgers in September, and allowed two earned runs on one hit and four walks.  He is the first, and only, player to wear the number 98 in Major League Baseball.

He missed all of the 2014 season after undergoing shoulder surgery in the offseason.

Chicago White Sox
On November 20, 2014, García was claimed off waivers by the Chicago White Sox. The White Sox outrighted him to the minors on April 3. He was released by the White Sox in March 2016.

Diablos Rojos del México
On July 8, 2016, García signed with the Diablos Rojos del México of the Mexican League. He was released on September 23, 2016.

Kansas City Royals
On October 21, 2016, García signed a minor league contract with the Kansas City Royals. He pitched for the Omaha Storm Chasers of the Class AAA Pacific Coast League, and was promoted to the major leagues on August 26, 2017. He was designated for assignment on September 12, 2017, when the team claimed Mike Morin off of waivers. On December 18, 2017, García was released to pursue a playing opportunity in Japan.

Chunichi Dragons
On December 20, 2017, García was confirmed to have signed with the Chunichi Dragons of Nippon Professional Baseball(NPB).

He was selected . On December 1, 2018, it was confirmed that the Dragons had released Garcia after failing to reach an agreement over a new deal.

Hanshin Tigers
On December 17, 2018, García signed a one-year, $1.5 million contract with the Hanshin Tigers of NPB.

On December 14, 2019, García signed a 1-year extension to remain with the Tigers.

On December 2, 2020, he became a free agent.

CTBC Brothers
On December 25, 2020, García signed a one-year, $500,000 deal with the CTBC Brothers of the Chinese Professional Baseball League. On March 15, 2021, García was released by the Brothers after failing his physical. It was discovered that after he arrived in Taiwan, he had a pre-existing shoulder and elbow injury.

Leones de Yucatán
On July 13, 2021, García signed with the Leones de Yucatán of the Mexican League.

See also
List of baseball players who defected from Cuba

References

External links

1989 births
Living people
2023 World Baseball Classic players
Águilas de Mexicali players
Cuban expatriate baseball players in Mexico
Albuquerque Isotopes players
Birmingham Barons players
Charlotte Knights players
Chattanooga Lookouts players
Chunichi Dragons players
Defecting Cuban baseball players
Diablos Rojos del México players
Glendale Desert Dogs players
Hanshin Tigers players
Indios de Guantanamo players
Indios de Mayagüez players
Cuban expatriate baseball players in Puerto Rico
Kansas City Royals players
Leones de Ponce players
Los Angeles Dodgers players
Major League Baseball pitchers
Major League Baseball players from Cuba
Cuban expatriate baseball players in the United States
Mesa Solar Sox players
Mexican League baseball pitchers
Nippon Professional Baseball pitchers
Northwest Arkansas Naturals players
Omaha Storm Chasers players
Rancho Cucamonga Quakes players
Sportspeople from Guantánamo
Cuban expatriate baseball players in Japan
Cuban expatriate baseball players in the Dominican Republic